The 1977 All-Big Eight Conference football team consists of American football players chosen by various organizations for All-Big Eight Conference teams for the 1977 NCAA Division I football season.  The selectors for the 1977 season included the Associated Press (AP).

Offensive selections

Quarterbacks
 Thomas Lott, Oklahoma (AP)

Running backs
 Terry Miller, Oklahoma State (AP)
 Dexter Green, Iowa State (AP)
 I. M. Hipp, Nebraska (AP)

Tight ends
 Kellen Winslow, Missouri (AP)

Centers
 Tom Davis, Nebraska (AP)

Offensive guards
 Greg Roberts, Oklahoma (AP)
 Greg Jorgensen, Nebraska (AP)

Offensive tackles
 Karl Baldischwiler, Oklahoma (AP)
 James Taylor, Missouri (AP)

Wide receivers
 Joe Stewart, Missouri (AP)

Defensive selections

Defensive ends
 Randy Westendorf, Colorado (AP)
 Daria Butler, Oklahoma State (AP)

Defensive tackles
 Tom Randall, Iowa State (AP)
 Mike Stensrud, Iowa State (AP)

Nose guards
 Reggie Kinlaw, Oklahoma (AP)

Linebackers
 Gary Spani, Kansas State (AP)
 George Cumby, Oklahoma (AP)
 Darryl Hunt, Oklahoma (AP)

Defensive backs
 Zac Henderson, Oklahoma (AP)
 Odis McKinney, Oklahoma (AP)
 Tom Fitch, Kansas (AP)

Key

AP = Associated Press

See also
 1977 College Football All-America Team

References

All-Big Seven Conference football team
All-Big Eight Conference football teams